Tom Hart (born October 8, 1969) is an American comics creator best known for his Hutch Owen series of comics.

Career
Tom Hart began making mini-comics while living in Seattle in the early 1990s. Like many of his colleagues including Megan Kelso, Dave Lasky, Jason Lutes, Jon Lewis, and James Sturm he was an early recipient of the Xeric Foundation grant for cartoonists.

His Xeric-winning book, Hutch Owen's Working Hard was 56 pages and self-published in 1994.

His next book, New Hat, was published through Canadian publisher Black Eye Productions in 1995. Black Eye then published his next book, The Sands, in 1997.

Hart returned to the Hutch Owen series and published a first collection of stories with Top Shelf Productions in 2000. Later books in the series have also been published by Top Shelf. Time magazine has called Hutch Owen "A devastating satire [which] feels like a scalding hot poker cauterizing the open wound of American corporate and consumer culture."

Hutch Owen has also been distributed as daily print and webcomic strips, and Hart is a former editor of and contributor to serializer.net. One of the original comics on serializer was Trunktown, a Hutch Owen spin-off drawn by Hart and written by Shaenon Garrity. His strip version of Hutch Owen, ran in the Metro newspaper in New York and Boston for a year and a half from 2006-2008.

In 2008 his comic strip collaboration with Marguerite Dabaie, Ali's House, was bought and syndicated by King Features Syndicate. The strip is now archived at GoComics.

Tom Hart is also an experienced teacher, having taught for more than six years at New York's School of Visual Arts, Parsons, the Education Alliance, Young Audiences, numerous places across the country and all over New York City.

He had three books pending in 2010, Let's Get Furious, a collection of all the Hutch Owen comic strips, How to Say Everything, a book about creativity in comics, and She's Not Into Poetry, a collection of his 1990s mini-comics.

In 2012 he published Daddy Lightning, about his experiences as a father.  In January 2016 he published Rosalie Lightning, a memoir named after his daughter, who had died suddenly when she was almost two, and about his and his wife's grief and their attempts to make sense of their life afterwards.

Personal life
Hart is married to fellow cartoonist  Leela Corman.

Notes

References

Tom Hart at Lambiek's Comiclopedia

External links

HutchOwen.com

People from Kingston, New York
School of Visual Arts faculty
Alternative cartoonists
Living people
1969 births